The 2020 FC Tokyo season is their 9th consecutive season in J1 League after finishing the 2019 season in 2nd place. They will also compete in the J.League Cup.

Squad

Competitions

J1 League

League table

Matches

J. League Cup

Finals

References 

Tokyo
FC Tokyo seasons